Pedro Nuñez de Villavicencio (1635–1700) was a Spanish painter of the Baroque period.

He was born and died in Seville. Trained by Murillo. Was named a knight of the order of San Juan. With the order he performed duties in Malta, where he met Mattia Preti. Returning to Spain, along with Murillo, he helped establish the Academia de Seville. When Murillo died, he traveled to Madrid.

Works

His paintings included:
Niño espulgando a un perro (c. 1650), the Hermitage, Saint Petersburg
Saint Anne, the Virgin and Child (Santa Ana, la Virgen y el Niño), framed and completed in 1677, Museo de Bellas Artes de Valencia.
Niño atacado por perros (c. 1680), Museum of Fine Arts, Budapest
Juegos infantiles (Children's Games) (1686), the Prado, Madrid
Joven pastor con vacas (A Young Pastor with Cows), Ferens Art Gallery, Hull
Fallen Apple Basket

References

González Ramos, Roberto Pedro Núñez de Villavicencio. Caballero pintor, Seville, 1999

External links

Pedro Nuñez de Villavicencio on Artcyclopedia

1635 births
1700 deaths
People from Seville
17th-century Spanish painters
Spanish male painters
Painters from Seville